William Barrie McCulloch (24 May 1927 – 7 March 2013) was a Scottish professional football player and coach.

References

External links
 

Scottish footballers
Association football wingers
Airdrieonians F.C. (1878) players
Kilmarnock F.C. players
St Mirren F.C. players
Greenock Morton F.C. players
Scottish Football League players
1927 births
2013 deaths
Cumnock Juniors F.C. players
Scottish football managers
Scotland B international footballers
Footballers from South Ayrshire
People from Tarbolton